Dunham Massey railway station was a station in England, serving the Dunham Massey. The station opened in 1854 and closed in 1962.

Construction and opening
The Warrington and Altrincham Junction Railway (W&AJR) built its railway line from Warrington Arpley via Latchford, Cheshire and Lymm to Skelton Junction near Altrincham during 1852–53 and passenger train services commenced on 1 November 1853. There were six intermediate stations provided along the line's length including that at Dunham Massey, in Cheshire, which was opened in June 1854. The station was located on the south side of Henshall Lane.

Names used by the station
The station was named Warburton from its opening until June 1856 when it became Warburton and Dunham. In October 1856 it was renamed Dunham, finally becoming Dunham Massey in April 1861, which name was retained until closure.

Train services from the station
The W&AJR changed its name to the Warrington and Stockport Railway on 4 August 1853, before the line was completed and that company was absorbed into the London and North Western Railway (LNWR) on 15 July 1867. The main LNWR train service through Dunham Massey station was from Liverpool Lime Street via Warrington Arpley to Broadheath, where trains joined the Manchester South Junction and Altrincham Railway and continued via Sale to Manchester London Road. In July 1922 the LNWR operated fifteen passenger trains in each direction on weekdays, eleven serving the full length of the line from Liverpool to Manchester and return.

Amalgamation, nationalisation and closure

The LNWR was amalgamated into the London Midland and Scottish Railway (LMSR) on 1 January 1923. The LMSR continued to operate the passenger train service through Dunham Massey, but by July 1946 only eight trains per day in each direction stopped at the station. The LMSR was nationalised on 1 January 1948 and operations on the line were vested in British Railways London Midland Region (LMR).  In January 1956 the service to Dunham Massey was eight trains in each direction, with the fare for the eleven miles single journey to Manchester being 1s 7d (8p).

Passenger services along the line were withdrawn and the station was closed by British Railways on 10 September 1962. Freight trains continued to use the line until 7 July 1985, when the need for extensive repairs to the Latchford Viaduct caused the line to be closed. The station building survives in use as a domestic dwelling.

References
Notes

Bibliography

Disused railway stations in Trafford
Former London and North Western Railway stations
Railway stations in Great Britain opened in 1854
Railway stations in Great Britain closed in 1962